The Stradanus engraving is a 1615 or 1621 (depending on the source) engraving that was used to print certificates of indulgences of forty days' remission of sins from Juan Pérez de la Serna, then Archbishop of Mexico.  The certificates were given to people who donated money to finance the construction of the new sanctuary of Tepeyac, consecrated in 1622, which later became the Basilica of Guadalupe.  Its actual title is Virgen de Guadalupe con escenas de ocho milagros, but the term "Stradanus engraving" is used by Guadalupan researchers.  

It is the first document to depict the apparition of the Virgin of Guadalupe, and may have been a source of the Nican motecpana, the portion of the Huei tlamahuiçoltica, an early source of the Guadalupan apparition, that relates the miracles associated with the icon.

The granting of indulgences for cash was (since at least 1567) not supposed to be allowed by the church.

External links
The Stradanus engraving at the Metropolitan Museum of Art

 

Mexican art
Colonial Mexico
Prints including the Virgin Mary
Catholic Church in Mexico
Our Lady of Guadalupe
17th-century prints